Tripper is the fifth full-length album by indie rock band Fruit Bats. It was released on August 2, 2011, on Sub Pop Records. A 1980s-esque music video for the song "You're Too Weird" preceded the release of the album.

Track listing
 Tony the Tripper
 So Long
 Tangie and Ray
 Shivering Fawn
 You're Too Weird
 Heart Like an Orange
 Dolly
 The Banishment Song
 The Fen
 Wild Honey
 Picture of a Bird
 Wac’s (ITunes Bonus Track Only)

References

2011 albums
Sub Pop albums
Fruit Bats (band) albums